VA-106 was an Attack Squadron of the U.S. Navy. Originally established as Bomber-Fighter Squadron Seventeen (VBF-17) on 2 January 1945, it was redesignated Fighter Squadron Six B (VF-6B) on 15 November 1946, redesignated VF-62 on 28 July 1948, redesignated Attack Squadron 106 (VA-106) on 1 July 1955, it was disestablished on 7 November 1969. It was the second US Navy squadron to be designated VA-106.

Operational history

World War II
16–17 February 1945: The squadron participated in strikes against targets in and around the Tokyo area.
20–22 February 1945: Squadron aircraft participated in strikes against Iwo Jima and provided air support for the landings on the island.
18–19 March 1945: Major strikes were conducted by squadron aircraft against Kanoya, the largest airfield on Kyushu and against the Japanese Fleet anchored at Kure Naval Base.
March–May 1945: The squadron conducted strikes in support of the Okinawa campaign
7 Apr 1945: The unit participated in the combined task force strikes against the super battleship Yamato and its accompanying escorts, resulting in the sinking of Yamato, two cruisers and three destroyers.
May 1945: The squadron participated in strikes against Kyushu and Shikoku, hitting aircraft plants and airfields. On 14 May the squadron's commanding officer, LTCDR H. W. Nicholson, was killed in action during a strike against Kyushu.

1950s
26 April to 4 December 1953, VF-62 was assigned to Carrier Air Group 4 (CVG-4) aboard  for a deployment to Korea and the Western Pacific.
August–November 1956: During the Suez Crisis,  was ordered to the eastern Mediterranean as tensions increased and France and the United Kingdom began preparations for military action against Egypt. Coral Sea was on station during the American evacuation of Western nationals from Egypt and Israel.
July 1959: During the NATO exercise Riptide, held off the east coast of the United States, the squadron conducted cross-deck operations with the British carrier .

1960s
2–19 June 1961: Following the assassination of dictator General Rafael Trujillo, the squadron operated from USS Shangri-La off the coast of the Dominican Republic.
May 1963: The squadron operated from USS Shangri-La in the Caribbean during the period of unrest in Haiti and the Dominican Republic.

Vietnam War
29 Jul 1967: In the USS Forrestal fire the squadron suffered 10 killed and 62 injured.

Home port assignments
The squadron was assigned to these home ports, effective on the dates shown:
NAS Agana -2 January 1945
NAS Alameda - 8 July 1945
NAAS Fallon - September 1945
NAS Brunswick - February 1946
NAS Norfolk - 1946
NAS Oceana - 25 September 1948
NAS Norfolk - 22 November 1948
NAS Oceana - 20 January 1949
NAS Cecil Field - 18 September 1950
NAS Jacksonville - 13 October 1952
NAS Cecil Field - December 1954

Aircraft assignment
The squadron first received the following aircraft on the dates shown:
F6F-5 Hellcat - January 1945
F4U Corsair - September 1945
F4U-4 - February 1946
F8F-2 - 30 June 1948
F8F-1B - February 1950
F2H-2 Banshee - 3 August 1950
F9F-8B Cougar - October 1955
A4D-2 Skyhawk - 4 June 1958
 A-4C - 18 December 1962
A-4E - November 1966
A-4B February 1969
A-4C March 1969

See also
 VFA-106 "Gladiators" 1984–present
List of inactive United States Navy aircraft squadrons
 History of the United States Navy

References

External links

Aircraft squadrons of the United States Navy
Wikipedia articles incorporating text from the Dictionary of American Naval Aviation Squadrons